Susannah M. Whipps (formerly known as Susannah Whipps Lee) is a member of the Massachusetts House of Representatives, first sworn in on January 7, 2015. A seventh generation resident of Athol, Massachusetts, she was elected as a Republican to represent the 2nd Franklin District, but changed her party affiliation to independent in August 2017. The 2nd Franklin District consists of 12 communities in central and western Massachusetts.

Whipps serves on the Joint Committee on Mental Health and Substance Abuse, Joint Committee on Municipalities and Regional Government, Joint Committee on Elder Affairs, and the Joint Committee on State Administration and Regulatory Oversight. She also serves on the Statewide Taskforce on Child Sexual Abuse Prevention. Whipps is a co-owner of Whipps, Inc. a local stainless-steel equipment manufacturer.

On August 21, 2017, Whipps announced that she had officially changed her voter registration from Republican to unenrolled (independent). "I represent a district where nearly 2/3 of the voters are unaffiliated with any major political party" explained Whipps. Public records show that 65% of voters in the 2nd Franklin District are unenrolled, 22% are registered as members of the Democratic Party, and 12% are registered as members of the Republican Party.

See also
 2019–2020 Massachusetts legislature
 2021–2022 Massachusetts legislature

References

 

Republican Party members of the Massachusetts House of Representatives
People from Athol, Massachusetts
Living people
Women state legislators in Massachusetts
21st-century American politicians
21st-century American women politicians
Massachusetts Independents
Year of birth missing (living people)